Michael O'Connor (4 October 1829 – 14 February 1883), was the first Catholic Bishop of Ballarat {located in Victoria (Australia)}.

O'Connor was born in Dublin, Ireland and educated at Maynooth and was a Dunboyne Scholarship Student, at Maynooth he won numerous honours. Taking holy orders, he was appointed parish priest of Rathfarnham, Dublin. In 1875, he was appointed first Roman Catholic Bishop of Ballarat in Victoria, being installed in the cathedral of that city by Archbishop Goold on 20 November of that year. The Bishop died on 14 February 1883.

References 

1829 births
1883 deaths
Christian clergy from Dublin (city)
Alumni of St Patrick's College, Maynooth
Irish emigrants to Australia
Roman Catholic bishops of Ballarat
Irish expatriate Catholic bishops